The 1979–80 Drexel Dragons men's basketball team represented Drexel University  during the 1979–80 NCAA Division I men's basketball season. The Dragons, led by 3rd year head coach Eddie Burke, played their home games at the Daskalakis Athletic Center and were members of the East Coast Conference (ECC).

The team finished the season 12–15, and finished in 6th place in the ECC East in the regular season.

Roster

Schedule

|-
!colspan=9 style="background:#F8B800; color:#002663;"| Regular season
|-

|-
!colspan=12 style="background:#FFC600; color:#07294D;"| ECC Tournament
|-

Awards
Dave Broadus
ECC All-Conference Second Team

References

Drexel Dragons men's basketball seasons
Drexel
1979 in sports in Pennsylvania
Drexel